USS Kestrel II (SP-529) was a United States Navy patrol vessel in commission from 1917 to 1918.

Kestrel II was built in 1912 as a private motor yacht of the same name by Percy Tuttle at Greenport on Long Island, New York, for D. Herbert Hostetter of New York City. On 2 June 1917, the U.S. Navy acquired her from her owner for use as a section patrol vessel during World War I. She was commissioned as USS Kestrel II (SP-529) on 4 June 1917 at Newport, Rhode Island.

Assigned to the 2nd Naval District and based at New London, Connecticut, Kestrel II operated on patrol duties in Long Island Sound for the rest of World War I.

Kestrel II was decommissioned on 6 January 1919 and returned to her owner the same day.

References

Department of the Navy Naval History and Heritage Command Online Library of Selected Images: Civilian Ships: Kestrel II (Motor Yacht, 1912). Served as USS Kestrel II (SP-529) in 1917-1919
NavSource Online: Section Patrol Craft Photo Archive: Kestrel II (SP 529)

Patrol vessels of the United States Navy
World War I patrol vessels of the United States
Ships built in Greenport, New York
1912 ships
Individual yachts